Pietramontecorvino is a town and comune in the province of Foggia in the Apulia region of southeast Italy.  It is located in the Monti Dauni, on a rocky spur commanding the valley of the Triolo, a right tributary of the Candelaro river.

Main sights
Norman Tower, a remain of the medieval fortifications
Church of Santa Maria Assunta (perhaps built in the late 12th century). It was modified in the 16th and 18th centuries.
Ducal Palace

References

Cities and towns in Apulia
Populated places established in the 14th century